Air Marshal Sir Kenneth William Hayr,  (13 April 1935 – 2 June 2001) was a senior Royal Air Force commander who served as Deputy Air Officer Commanding-in-Chief Strike Command and Deputy Chief of the Defence Staff (Commitments).

Early life and flying career
Born in Whangarei, New Zealand, Hayr was educated at Auckland Grammar School. He joined the Royal New Zealand Air Force and was sent to the United Kingdom to attend the RAF College Cranwell, graduating in 1957. 

Hayr was Officer Commanding No. 228 Operational Conversion Unit at RAF Coningsby during the introduction of the F4 Phantom and subsequent training of No. 6 and No. 54 Squadrons. He was then appointed Officer Commanding No. 1 Squadron in 1970. The following year, he married Joyce Gardiner: they had three sons. Hayr served as Station Commander at RAF Binbrook in Lincolnshire in 1974. He attended the Royal College of Defence Studies, after which he took up the post of Assistant Chief of the Air Staff (Operations) in 1980. During this period he was responsible for much of the planning of the RAF's part in the re-capture of the Falkland Islands. In 1982, he was made Air Officer Commanding No. 11 Group.

Hayr became Commander, British Forces Cyprus and Administrator of the Sovereign Base Areas in 1985. Returning to Britain he was Deputy Air Officer Commanding-in-Chief Strike Command from 1988 until being appointed Deputy Chief of the Defence Staff (Commitments) at the Ministry of Defence in 1989, which in 1990 involved him leading the preparation for Operation Granby.

Later life and legacy
On retirement Hayr returned to New Zealand and took up the Chairmanship of the New Zealand Aviation Heritage Trust Board, but continued to split his time between the UK and New Zealand in order to continue his love for flying by performing displays in various vintage aircraft. It was in such an aircraft, a De Havilland Vampire, that he was killed during the 2001 Biggin Hill air display.

In 1996, the Inspectorate of Flight Safety moved into new purpose-built accommodation at RAF Bentley Priory and the facility's new lecture theatre was named 'The Hayr Theatre' in honour of Hayr who was the first Inspector in 1976 (prior to that date the post had been that of Director). Following the closure of Bentley Priory his picture now hangs in the DARS Course Members Tea bar at RAF Northolt in memory of the Lecture theatre at RAF Bentley Priory.

References

|-

|-

|-

1935 births
2001 deaths
Graduates of the Royal College of Defence Studies
Royal New Zealand Air Force personnel
Royal Air Force air marshals
Knights Commander of the Order of the Bath
Knights Commander of the Order of the British Empire
Graduates of the Royal Air Force College Cranwell
Royal Air Force personnel of the Falklands War
People educated at Auckland Grammar School
New Zealand recipients of the Air Force Cross (United Kingdom)
Royal Air Force air marshals of the Gulf War